Cappellotto is an Italian surname. Notable people with the surname include:

Alessandra Cappellotto (born 1968), Italian cyclist
Valeria Cappellotto (1970–2015), Italian cyclist, sister of Alessandra

Italian-language surnames